Lucy Kate Jackson (born October 29, 1948) is an American actress and television producer, known for her television roles as Sabrina Duncan in the series Charlie's Angels (1976–1979) and Amanda King in the series Scarecrow and Mrs. King (1983–1987). Her film roles include Making Love (1982) and Loverboy (1989). She is a three-time Emmy Award nominee and four-time Golden Globe Award nominee.

Jackson began her career in the late 1960s in summer stock, before landing major television roles in Dark Shadows (1970–71), Bonanza (1972–72), and The Rookies (1972–1976). She also appeared in the film Night of Dark Shadows (1971). The huge success of her role as Sabrina Duncan on Charlie's Angels saw her appear on the front cover of Time magazine, alongside co-stars Farrah Fawcett and Jaclyn Smith, while her role as Mrs. King won her Germany's Bravo Golden Otto Award for Best Female TV Star three times (1986–1988). She then continued to star in numerous TV movies, including Quiet Killer (1992), Empty Cradle (1993) and Satan's School for Girls (2000), a remake of the 1973 TV movie of the same name in which she also starred.

Early life and career
Jackson was born in Birmingham, Alabama, the daughter of Ruth (née Shepherd) and Hogan Jackson, a business executive. She attended The Brooke Hill School for Girls while residing in Mountain Brook. Jackson went on to enroll at the University of Mississippi as a history major where she was a member of the Delta Rho chapter of the Kappa Kappa Gamma sorority. Halfway through her sophomore year, she transferred to Birmingham–Southern College, a liberal arts college, taking classes in speech and history of the theatre. At the end of the academic year, Jackson became an apprentice at the Stowe Playhouse in Stowe, Vermont, and then moved to New York City to study acting at the American Academy of Dramatic Arts.

Initially, Jackson worked as an NBC page and tour guide at the network's Rockefeller Center before landing a role as the mysterious, silent ghost Daphne Harridge on the 1960s supernatural daytime soap opera Dark Shadows. In 1971, Jackson had a starring role as Tracy Collins in Night of Dark Shadows, the second feature film based on the daytime serial. This movie was more loosely based on the series than the first feature film, and it did not fare as well at the box office. The same year, she appeared in two episodes of the short-lived sitcom The Jimmy Stewart Show.

She then appeared as nurse Jill Danko for four seasons on the 1970s crime drama The Rookies. A supporting cast member, Jackson filled her free time by studying directing and editing. She also appeared in several TV films during this period. Jackson's performance was well received in the 1972 independent film Limbo, one of the first theatrical films to address the Vietnam War and the wives of soldiers who were POWs, MIA or killed in action. She also appeared in Death Scream, a 1975 television dramatization of the circumstances surrounding the 1964 murder of Kitty Genovese.

Career

Charlie's Angels (1976–1979)
In 1975, Jackson met with Rookies producers Aaron Spelling and Leonard Goldberg to discuss her contractual obligation to star in another television series for Spelling/Goldberg Productions upon that show's cancellation. Goldberg told her of a series that was available—because "every network has passed on it,” The Alley Cats. Spelling said that when he told Jackson the title of the series had to be changed and asked her what she would like to call it, she replied "Charlie's Angels,” pointing to a picture of three female angels on the wall behind Spelling. Jackson was originally cast as Kelly Garrett (which ultimately went to her co-star Jaclyn Smith), but decided upon Sabrina Duncan instead. The huge success of the show saw Jackson, Smith and Farrah Fawcett-Majors (who played Jill Munroe) appear on the front cover of Time magazine. The show aired as a movie of the week on March 21, 1976, before debuting as a series on September 22, 1976. Because Jackson was considered the star of Charlie's Angels following her experience and four years on The Rookies, her original role of Kelly Garrett was featured prominently in the pilot movie.

Jackson hosted the thirteenth episode of season four of Saturday Night Live which aired in February 1979. During her monologue, she referred to being an NBC page ten years earlier where she led tours of the studio. At the beginning of the third season of Charlie's Angels, Jackson was offered the Meryl Streep role in the feature film Kramer vs. Kramer (1979), but was forced to turn it down because Spelling told her that the show's shooting schedule could not be rearranged to give her time to do the film. At the end of the third season, Jackson left the show saying, "I served it well and it served me well, now it's time to go." Spelling cast Shelley Hack as her replacement.

Making Love and Scarecrow and Mrs. King (1982–1987)
Jackson starred alongside Harry Hamlin and her Rookies co-star Michael Ontkean in the feature film Making Love (1982), directed by Arthur Hiller. It was a movie some considered to be ahead of its time, and attempted to deal sensitively with the topic of homosexuality. However, it received tepid reviews and did poorly at the box office.

In 1983, Jackson had a starring role in Scarecrow and Mrs. King, a one-hour action drama in which she played housewife Amanda King opposite Bruce Boxleitner's spy, code-named "Scarecrow.” Jackson also co-produced the series with Warner Brothers Television through her production company, Shoot the Moon Enterprises. During this time she developed an interest in directing. Scarecrow and Mrs. King aired for four seasons from 1983–1987.

During filming of the show's fourth season, in January 1987, Jackson had a mammogram for the first time, which found a small malignant tumor. Her series' producer—the only person she told about the diagnosis—rescheduled her work on the show. She checked in to a hospital under an alias to have a lumpectomy. Jackson returned to the series a week later, working with the aid of painkillers through five weeks of radiation treatments.

1988 to 2003
After undergoing breast cancer treatment, Jackson followed up on Scarecrow and Mrs. King by taking on the main role in Baby Boom, a 1988 TV sitcom version of a 1987 film of the same name. The series lasted less than one season, canceled with episodes left unaired.

In 1989, Jackson starred in the film Loverboy, directed by Joan Micklin Silver.

In September 1989, another mammogram indicated residual breast cancer that the previous operation had missed. Jackson had a partial mastectomy and reconstructive surgery. Jackson's Charlie's Angels colleague Jaclyn Smith made statements indicating her support of Jackson.

In 1995, Jackson was diagnosed as having been born with an atrial septal defect that had previously gone undetected. Jackson underwent open-heart surgery to correct the defect.

Jackson spoke publicly about breast cancer and heart health and received the "Power of Love" award in 2003 from the American Heart Association for raising awareness among the public regarding those issues.

2004 to present
In 2004, the television film Behind the Camera: The Unauthorized Story of Charlie's Angels aired, with actress Lauren Stamile portraying Jackson. In August 2006, Jackson, Farrah Fawcett and Jaclyn Smith, the three original Angels, made a surprise appearance together at the 58th Primetime Emmy Awards in a tribute to the recently deceased Angels creator Aaron Spelling.

In 2007, Jackson played the mother of FBI agent Emily Prentiss on Criminal Minds. In August 2008, she was a guest judge on an episode of Jaclyn Smith's Bravo reality series Shear Genius, presiding over a hairdressing competition to update the original trio's signature hairdos.

On August 3, 2010, Gallery Books announced a contract with Jackson to publish her memoirs. The book, expected in 2011, has been repeatedly delayed, with the latest update reporting a scheduled release for two days before 2021.

She has not appeared in film or television since 2009.

Personal life
Jackson lived with, and was engaged to, actor Edward Albert in the mid-1970s. She was then linked romantically to producer Robert Evans, stuntman Gary Quist and actors Dirk Benedict, Nick Nolte and Warren Beatty. After a six-month courtship, Jackson married actor Andrew Stevens (the son of actress Stella Stevens) in August 1978. The couple divorced in 1981. After her divorce from Stevens, Jackson said, "I felt as if my ex-husband drove up to my bank account with a Brink's truck." Jackson was then linked with actor Gary Pendergast and screenwriter Tom Mankiewicz. She married New York businessman David Greenwald in 1982, and they formed 'Shoot The Moon Productions' together, the company that produced Jackson's series Scarecrow and Mrs. King. The couple divorced in 1984.

After the divorce, Jackson was frequently seen with dermatologist Arnold Klein. While recovering from her second bout with breast cancer and on vacation in Aspen, Colorado in 1989, Jackson met Tom Hart, the owner of a Utah ski lodge, and the pair married in 1991. The couple resided both in Los Angeles and Park City, Utah. Jackson became stepmother to Sean, Hart's son from a previous relationship. Jackson and Hart divorced in 1993. In 1995, Jackson adopted a son, Charles Taylor Jackson.

In May 2010, Jackson sued her financial advisor, Richard B. Francis, claiming his actions cost her more than $3 million ($ million today) and brought her to financial ruin. The parties reached an undisclosed settlement in December 2010.

Filmography

Film

Television films

Television series

References

External links

 
 Kate Jackson at Allmovie
 

1948 births
20th-century American actresses
21st-century American actresses
Actresses from Birmingham, Alabama
American Academy of Dramatic Arts alumni
American film actresses
American soap opera actresses
American television actresses
Birmingham–Southern College alumni
Living people
People from Mountain Brook, Alabama
University of Mississippi alumni